Bats are one of the major components of the indigenous mammalian fauna of Madagascar, in addition to tenrecs, lemurs, euplerid carnivores, and nesomyine rodents. Forty-six bat species have so far been recorded on Madagascar, of which thirty-six occur only on the island. However, new species continue to be discovered, causing the number of species to rise rapidly; for example, Nick Garbutt's Mammals of Madagascar (2007) listed only 36 species. Most Malagasy bats have their origins in nearby mainland Africa, but on at least three occasions—Pipistrellus raceyi, Pteropus rufus, and the species pair Emballonura atrata–E. tiavato—bats have colonized Madagascar from Asia.

Taxonomic classification
The following bat genera and families include species found on Madagascar (all species counts are for Madagascar only):
Family Pteropodidae (3 endemic species)
Genus Eidolon (1 endemic species)
Genus Pteropus (1 endemic species)
Genus Rousettus (1 endemic species)
Family Hipposideridae (6 endemic species)
Genus Hipposideros (1 extinct endemic species)
Genus Macronycteris (2 endemic species)
Genus Paratriaenops (2 endemic species)
Genus Triaenops (2 endemic species, one of which is extinct)
Family Emballonuridae (2 endemic, 2 non-endemic species)
Genus Coleura (1 non-endemic species)
Genus Emballonura (2 endemic species)
Genus Taphozous (1 non-endemic species)
Family Nycteridae (1 endemic species)
Genus Nycteris (1 endemic species)
Family Myzopodidae (2 endemic species)
Genus Myzopoda (2 endemic species)
Family Molossidae (5 endemic, 3 non-endemic species)
Genus Chaerephon (2 endemic, 1 non-endemic species)
Genus Mops (1 endemic, 1 non-endemic species)
Genus Mormopterus (1 endemic species)
Genus Otomops (1 endemic species)
Genus Tadarida (1 non-endemic species)
Family Miniopteridae (9 endemic, 2 non-endemic species)
Genus Miniopterus (9 endemic, 2 non-endemic species)
Family Vespertilionidae (8 endemic, 4 non-endemic species)
Genus Hypsugo (1 non-endemic species)
Genus Myotis (1 endemic species)
Genus Neoromicia (3 endemic species)
Genus Pipistrellus (1 endemic, 1 non-endemic species)
Genus Scotophilus (3 endemic, 1 non-endemic species)

Key

Family Pteropodidae
Pteropodidae are a diverse family, with 186 species recognized in 2005, which occurs across the tropical regions of the Old World. They include the largest bats, but also some smaller species, and are mostly diurnal and frugivorous. Three species are known from Madagascar; each is classified in its own genus and is most closely related to species from outside Madagascar.

Family Hipposideridae
Hipposideridae are a moderately diverse family—81 species were listed in 2005—and occur across the Old World tropics. Insectivorous, cave-roosting, and characterized by an elaborate noseleaf, they have often been united with the horseshoe bats (Rhinolophus; absent from Madagascar) into a single family Rhinolophidae, but are currently classified separately. Six species, all endemic, are known from Madagascar, of which four are extant. Macronycteris commersoni is the largest non-pteropodid bat of Madagascar and the extinct Hipposideros besaoka was even larger. The other species belong to the closely related genera Triaenops and Paratriaenops; the latter was split from Triaenops in 2009 and is restricted to Madagascar and the western Seychelles.

Family Emballonuridae
With 51 species (2005), Emballonuridae are a moderately diverse family. Found in tropical and subtropical regions across the world, they are characterized by a tail that extends beyond the uropatagium (tail membrane), but may be retracted into a sheath. Four species are known from Madagascar, of which two are endemic and two others are shared with mainland Africa.

Family Nycteridae
Nycteridae is a small family of 16 species (2005) in a single genus found in Africa and east to the Sunda Islands. They are characterized by a groove on their face and are insectivorous. A single, poorly known species has been recorded from Madagascar.

Family Myzopodidae

This family, characterized by suction disks on the hand and feet, is unique to Madagascar. (It does, however, have a fossil record in Africa extending from the late Eocene to the Pleistocene.) A single species has historically been recognized, but eastern and western populations were classified as separate species in 2007.

Family Molossidae
This diverse family of 100 species (2005) occurs across the world in tropical regions. The tail conspicuously projects from the uropatagium and the wings are long. Eight species are known from Madagascar, four of which are endemic.

Family Miniopteridae
This family contains a single genus, Miniopterus, with 19 species recognized in 2005, which was classified in Vespertilionidae until recently. Insectivorous and characterized by long fingers, the species are all quite similar, leading to a confused classification. On Madagascar, four species were recognized as recently as 2007, but systematic research has led the number to increase to eleven, of which nine are restricted to Madagascar and two shared with the Comoros.

Family Vespertilionidae
With 407 species (2005; including Miniopterus, which is now classified in its own family), Vespertilionidae is the largest bat family. Characterized by a tail contained in the uropatagium, they occur around the world in many habitats and are insectivorous. Madagascar hosts an endemic species of the extremely widespread genus Myotis, four species (three endemic) of the house bat Scotophilus, and at least six (four endemic) of small vespertilionids ("pipistrelles") in the genera Hypsugo, Eptesicus, Neoromicia, and Pipistrellus. The classification of the "pipistrelles" is confused, leading to many changing identifications. In addition to the six "pipistrelles" listed here, the African Neoromicia nanus has also been recorded from Madagascar, but the identification of the Madagascar records needs to be confirmed.

See also
List of mammals of Madagascar

Notes

References

Literature cited

General
Garbutt, N. 2007. Mammals of Madagascar: A Complete Guide. London: A & C Black, 304 pp. 
Goodman, S.M., Weyeneth, N., Ibrahim, Y., Saïd, I. and Ruedi, M. 2010b. A review of the bat fauna of the Comoro Archipelago (subscription required). Acta Chiropterologica 12(1):117–141.
Nowak, R.M. 1994. Walker's Bats of the World. Baltimore: The Johns Hopkins University Press, 287 pp. 
Simmons, N.B. 2005. Order Chiroptera. Pp. 312–529 in Wilson, D.E. and Reeder, D.M. (eds.). Mammal Species of the World: a taxonomic and geographic reference. 3rd ed. Baltimore: The Johns Hopkins University Press, 2 vols., 2142 pp. 
Wilson, D.E. and Reeder, D.M. (eds.). 2005. Mammal Species of the World: a taxonomic and geographic reference. 3rd ed. Baltimore: The Johns Hopkins University Press, 2 vols., 2142 pp.

Pteropodidae
Andriafidison, D., Cardiff, S.G., Goodman, S.M., Hutson, A.M., Jenkins, R.K.B., Kofoky, A.F., Racey, P.A., Ranivo, J., Ratrimomanarivo, F.H. and Razafimanahaka, H.J. 2008a. . IUCN Red List of Threatened Species. Version 2009.2. Downloaded May 26, 2010.
Andriafidison, D, Cardiff, S.G., Goodman, S.M., Hutson, A.M., Jenkins, R.K.B., Kofoky, A.F., Rabearivelo, A., Racey, P.A., Ranivo, J., Ratrimomanarivo, F.H. and Razafimanahaka, H.J. 2008b. . IUCN Red List of Threatened Species. Version 2009.2. Downloaded May 26, 2010.
Andriafidison, D., Cardiff, S.G., Goodman, S.M., Hutson, A.M., Jenkins, R.K.B., Kofoky, A.F., Racey, P.A., Ranivo, J., Ratrimomanarivo, F.H. and Razafimanahaka, H.J. 2008c. . IUCN Red List of Threatened Species. Version 2009.2. Downloaded May 26, 2010.

Hipposideridae
Andriafidison, D, Cardiff, S.G., Goodman, S.M., Hutson, A.M., Jenkins, R.K.B., Kofoky, A.F., Racey, P.A., Ranivo, J., Ratrimomanarivo, F.H. and Razafimanahaka, H.J. 2008f. . IUCN Red List of Threatened Species. Version 2009.2. Downloaded May 27, 2010.
Andriafidison, D., Cardiff, S.G., Goodman, S.M., Hutson, A.M., Jenkins, R.K.B., Kofoky, A.F., Racey, P.A., Ranivo, J., Ratrimomanarivo, F.H. and Razafimanahaka, H.J. 2008o. . IUCN Red List of Threatened Species. Version 2009.2. Downloaded May 27, 2010.
Andriafidison, D., Cardiff, S.G., Goodman, S.M., Hutson, A.M., Jenkins, R.K.B., Kofoky, A.F., Racey, P.A., Ranivo, J., Ratrimomanarivo, F.H. and Razafimanahaka, H.J. 2008p. . IUCN Red List of Threatened Species. Version 2009.2. Downloaded May 27, 2010.
Andriafidison, D., Cardiff, S.G., Goodman, S.M., Hutson, A.M., Jenkins, R.K.B., Kofoky, A.F., Racey, P.A., Ranivo, J., Ratrimomanarivo, F.H. and Razafimanahaka, H.J. 2008q. . IUCN Red List of Threatened Species. Version 2009.2. Downloaded May 27, 2010.
Benda, P. and Vallo, P. 2009. Taxonomic revision of the genus Triaenops (Chiroptera: Hipposideridae) with description of a new species from southern Arabia and definitions of a new genus and tribe. Folia Zoologica 58 (Monograph 1):1–45.

Goodman, S.M. and Ranivo, J. 2009. The geographical origin of the type specimens of Triaenops rufus and T. humbloti (Chiroptera: Hipposideridae) reputed to be from Madagascar and the description of a replacement species name (subscription required). Mammalia 73:47–55.

Ranivo, J. and Goodman S.M. 2006. Révision taxinomique des Triaenops malgaches (Mammalia, Chiroptera, Hipposideridae). Zoosystema 28(4):963–985.
Samonds, K.E. 2007. Late Pleistocene bat fossils from Anjohibe Cave, northwestern Madagascar. Acta Chiropterologica 9(1):39–65.

Emballonuridae
Goodman, S.M., Cardiff, S.G., Ranivo, J., Russell, A.L. and Yoder, A.D. 2006a. A new species of Emballonura (Chiroptera, Emballonuridae) from the dry regions of Madagascar. American Museum Novitates 3538:1–24.
Goodman, S.M., Cardiff, S.G. and Ratrimomanarivo, F.H. 2008a. First record of Coleura (Chiroptera: Emballonuridae) on Madagascar and identification and diagnosis of members of the genus (subscription required). Systematics and Biodiversity 6(2):283–292.
Hutson, A.M., Racey, P., Ravino, J., Mickleburgh, S., Bergmans, W. and Fahr, J. 2008c. . IUCN Red List of Threatened Species. Version 2009.2. Downloaded May 27, 2010.
Jenkins, R.K.B., Rakotoarivelo, A.R., Ratrimomanarivo, F.H. and Cardiff, S.G. 2008a. . IUCN Red List of Threatened Species. Version 2009.2. Downloaded May 27, 2010.
Jenkins, R.K.B., Rakotoarivelo, A.R., Ratrimomanarivo, F.H. and Cardiff, S.G. 2008b. . IUCN Red List of Threatened Species. Version 2009.2. Downloaded May 27, 2010.
Mickleburgh, S., Hutson, A.M., Racey, P.A., Cardiff, S. and Bergmans, W. 2008c. . IUCN Red List of Threatened Species. Version 2009.2. Downloaded May 27, 2010.

Nycteridae
Hutson, T., Racey, P.A. and Ravino, J. 2008a. . IUCN Red List of Threatened Species. Version 2009.2. Downloaded May 27, 2010.

Myzopodidae
Goodman, S.M., Rakotondraparany, F. and Kofoky, A. 2007. The description of a new species of Myzopoda (Myzopodidae: Chiroptera) from western Madagascar (subscription required). Mammalian Biology 72(2):65–81.
Jenkins, R.K.B., Rakotoarivelo, A.R., Ratrimomanarivo, F.H. and Cardiff, S.G. 2008c. . IUCN Red List of Threatened Species. Version 2009.2. Downloaded May 27, 2010.
Jenkins, R.K.B., Rakotoarivelo, A.R., Ratrimomanarivo, F.H. and Cardiff, S.G. 2008d. . IUCN Red List of Threatened Species. Version 2009.2. Downloaded May 27, 2010.

Molossidae
Andriafidison, D., Cardiff, S.G., Goodman, S.M., Hutson, A.M., Jenkins, R.K.B., Kofoky, A.F., Racey, P.A., Ranivo, J., Ratrimomanarivo, F.H. and Razafimanahaka, H.J. 2008i. . IUCN Red List of Threatened Species. Version 2009.2. Downloaded May 27, 2010.
Andriafidison, D., Cardiff, S.G., Goodman, S.M., Hutson, A.M., Jenkins, R.K.B., Kofoky, A.F., Racey, P.A., Ranivo, J., Ratrimomanarivo, F.H. and Razafimanahaka, H.J. 2008j. . IUCN Red List of Threatened Species. Version 2009.2. Downloaded May 27, 2010.
Andriafidison, D., Cardiff, S.G., Goodman, S.M., Hutson, A.M., Jenkins, R.K.B., Kofoky, A.F., Racey, P.A., Ranivo, J., Ratrimomanarivo, F.H. and Razafimanahaka, H.J. 2008n. . IUCN Red List of Threatened Species. Version 2009.2. Downloaded May 27, 2010.
Andriafidison, D., Cardiff, S.G., Goodman, S.M., Hutson, A.M., Jenkins, R.K.B., Kofoky, A.F., Racey, P.A., Ranivo, J., Ratrimomanarivo, F.H. and Razafimanahaka, H.J. 2014. . IUCN Red List of Threatened Species. Version 2014.3. Downloaded May 28, 2015.
Cotterill, F.P.D, Hutson, A.M., Racey, P.A. and Ravino, J. 2008. . IUCN Red List of Threatened Species. Version 2009.2. Downloaded May 27, 2010.
Goodman, S.M. and Cardiff, S.G. 2004. A new species of Chaerephon (Molossidae) from Madagascar with notes on other members of the family. Acta Chiropterologica 6(2):227–248.
Goodman, S.M., Buccas, W., Naidoo, T., Ratrimomanarivo, F., Taylor, P.J. and Lamb, J. 2010c. Patterns of morphological and genetic variation in western Indian Ocean members of the Chaerephon 'pumilus' complex (Chiroptera: Molossidae), with the description of a new species from Madagascar (subscription required). Zootaxa 2551:1–36.
Jenkins, R.K.B., Racey, P.A., Ranivo, J., Ratimomanarivo, F., Mickleburgh, S., Hutson, A.M., Bergmans, W., Cotterill, F.P.D. and Fahr, J. 2008e. . IUCN Red List of Threatened Species. Version 2009.2. Downloaded May 27, 2010.
Mickleburgh, S., Hutson, A.M., Racey, P.A., Ravino, J., Bergmans, W., Cotterill, F.P.D. and Gerlach, J. 2008b. . IUCN Red List of Threatened Species. Version 2009.2. Downloaded May 27, 2010.
Ratrimomanarivo, F.H., Goodman, S.M., Stanley, W.T., Naidoo, T., Taylor, P.J. and Lamb, J. 2009. Geographic and phylogeographic variation in Chaerephon leucogaster (Chiroptera: Molossidae) of Madagascar and the western Indian Ocean islands of Mayotte and Pemba (subscription required). Acta Chiropterologica 11(1):25–52.

Miniopteridae
Andriafidison, D., Cardiff, S.G., Goodman, S.M., Hutson, A.M., Jenkins, R.K.B., Kofoky, A.F., Racey, P.A., Ranivo, J., Ratrimomanarivo, F.H. and Razafimanahaka, H.J. 2008g. . IUCN Red List of Threatened Species. Version 2009.2. Downloaded May 27, 2010.
Andriafidison, D., Cardiff, S.G., Goodman, S.M., Hutson, A.M., Jenkins, R.K.B., Kofoky, A.F., Racey, P.A., Ranivo, J., Ratrimomanarivo, F.H. and Razafimanahaka, H.J. 2008h. . IUCN Red List of Threatened Species. Version 2009.2. Downloaded May 27, 2010.
Goodman, S.M., Bradman, H.M., Maminirina, C.P., Ryan, K.E., Christidis, L. and Appleton, B. 2008b. A new species of Miniopterus (Chiroptera: Miniopteridae) from lowland southeastern Madagascar. Mammalian Biology 73:199–213.
Goodman, S.M., Maminirina, C.P., Bradman, H.M., Christidis, L. and Appleton, B. 2009. The use of molecular phylogenetic and morphological tools to identify cryptic and paraphyletic species: Examples from the diminutive long-fingered bats (Chiroptera: Miniopteridae: Miniopterus) on Madagascar. American Museum Novitates 3669:1–34.
Goodman, S.M., Maminirina, C.P., Bradman, H.M., Christidis, L. and Appleton, B.R. 2010a. Patterns of morphological and genetic variation in the endemic Malagasy bat Miniopterus gleni (Chiroptera: Miniopteridae), with the description of a new species, M. griffithsi (subscription required). Journal of Zoological Systematics and Evolutionary Research 48(1):75–86.
Goodman, S.M., Ramasindrazana, B., Maminirina, C.P., Schoeman, M.C. and Appleton, B. 2011. Morphological, bioacoustical, and genetic variation in Miniopterus bats from eastern Madagascar, with the description of a new species. Zootaxa 2880:1–19.
Jenkins, R.K.B. and Rakotoarivelo, A.R. 2008a. . IUCN Red List of Threatened Species. Version 2009.2. Downloaded May 27, 2010.
Jenkins, R.K.B. and Rakotoarivelo, A.R. 2008b. . IUCN Red List of Threatened Species. Version 2009.2. Downloaded May 27, 2010.
Jenkins, R.K.B., Rakotoarivelo, A.R., Ratrimomanarivo, F.H. and Cardiff, S.G. 2008f. . IUCN Red List of Threatened Species. Version 2009.2. Downloaded May 27, 2010.

Vespertilionidae
Andriafidison, D., Cardiff, S.G., Goodman, S.M., Hutson, A.M., Jenkins, R.K.B., Kofoky, A.F., Racey, P.A., Ranivo, J., Ratrimomanarivo, F.H. and Razafimanahaka, H.J. 2008d. . IUCN Red List of Threatened Species. Version 2009.2. Downloaded May 27, 2010.
Andriafidison, D., Cardiff, S.G., Goodman, S.M., Hutson, A.M.M., Jenkins, R.K.B., Kofoky, A.F., Racey, P.A., Ranivo, J., Ratrimomanarivo, F.H. and Razafimanahaka, H.J. 2008e. . IUCN Red List of Threatened Species. Version 2009.2. Downloaded May 27, 2010.
Andriafidison, D., Cardiff, S.G., Goodman, S.M., Hutson, A.M., Jenkins, R.K.B., Kofoky, A.F., Racey, P.A., Ranivo, J., Ratrimomanarivo, F.H. and Razafimanahaka, H.J. 2008i. . IUCN Red List of Threatened Species. Version 2009.2. Downloaded May 27, 2010.
Andriafidison, D, Cardiff, S.G., Goodman, S.M., Hutson, A.M., Jenkins, R.K.B., Kofoky, A.F., Racey, P.A., Ranivo, J., Ratrimomanarivo, F.H. and Razafimanahaka, H.J. 2008k. . IUCN Red List of Threatened Species. Version 2009.2. Downloaded May 27, 2010.
Andriafidison, D., Cardiff, S.G., Goodman, S.M., Hutson, A.M., Jenkins, R.K.B., Kofoky, A.F., Racey, P.A., Ranivo, J., Ratrimomanarivo, F.H. and Razafimanahaka, H.J. 2008l. . IUCN Red List of Threatened Species. Version 2009.2. Downloaded May 27, 2010.
Bates, P.J.J., Ratrimomanarivo, F.H., Harrison, D.L. and Goodman, S.M. 2006. A description of a new species of Pipistrellus (Chiroptera: Vespertilionidae) from Madagascar with a review of related Vespertilioninae from the island. Acta Chiropterologica 8(2):299–324.
Goodman S.M., Jenkins R.K.B. and Ratrimomanarivo F.H. 2005. A review of the genus Scotophilus (Mammalia, Chiroptera, Vespertilionidae) on Madagascar, with the description of a new species. Zoosystema 27(4):867–882.
Goodman, S.M., Ratrimomanarivo, F.H. and Randrianandrianina, F.H. 2006b. A new species of Scotophilus (Chiroptera: Vespertilionidae) from western Madagascar. Acta Chiropterologica 8(1):21–37.
Goodman, S.M., Taylor, P.J., Ratrimomanarivo, F. and Hoofer, S.R. 2012. The genus Neoromicia (family Vespertilionidae) in Madagascar, with the description of a new species (subscription required). Zootaxa 3250:1–25.
Hutson, A.M., Racey, P.A., Goodman, S. and Jacobs, D. 2008b. . IUCN Red List of Threatened Species. Version 2009.2. Downloaded May 27, 2010.
Jacobs, D., Cotterill, F.P.D., Taylor, P.J., Monadjem, A. and Griffin, M. 2008. . IUCN Red List of Threatened Species. Version 2009.2. Downloaded May 27, 2010.
Jenkins, R.K.B., Rakotoarivelo, A.R., Ratrimomanarivo, F.H. and Cardiff, S.G. 2008g. . IUCN Red List of Threatened Species. Version 2009.2. Downloaded May 27, 2010.
Jenkins, R.K.B., Rakotoarivelo, A.R., Ratrimomanarivo, F.H. and Cardiff, S.G. 2008h. . IUCN Red List of Threatened Species. Version 2009.2. Downloaded May 27, 2010.
Jenkins, R.K.B., Rakotoarivelo, A.R., Ratrimomanarivo, F.H. and Cardiff, S.G. 2008i. . IUCN Red List of Threatened Species. Version 2009.2. Downloaded May 27, 2010.
Mickleburgh, S., Hutson, A.M. and Racey, P.A. 2008a. . IUCN Red List of Threatened Species. Version 2009.2. Downloaded May 27, 2010.

'Madagascar
Madagascar, bats
'bats
'Madagascar